The Parsian Esteghlal International Hotel is a hotel in Tehran, Iran. Opened in 1962 as the Royal Tehran Hilton, the hotel was designed by local Iranian architect Heydar Ghiai.

Overview 
The hotel's design consultants also included noted British architect Raglan Squire, who also designed Hilton hotels in Tunis, Bahrain, Nicosia and Jakarta.

The hotel originally consisted of a single tower containing 259 rooms. An additional tower, with 291 more rooms, was constructed in 1972. The hotel's famous guests during this period included Ethiopian Emperor Haile Selassie, King Hussein of Jordan, and astronauts Neil Armstrong, Buzz Aldrin and Michael Collins.

The hotel was renamed the Esteghlal Hotel (meaning "Independence" Hotel in Persian) following the Islamic Revolution in 1979, when all foreign hotel management contracts were severed. It is today part of the state-run Parsian International Hotels Co. A third tower is currently under construction.

Building and Construction Facts
Unlike its more contemporary twin building, the original white concrete of the first tower was able to retain its coloration due to an innovation by its architect Heydar Ghiai who decided to include particles of crushed white marble into the concrete mix.

Architect's References
 J.I Cohen, M. Eleb & A. Martinelli, "The 20th century Architecture & Urbanism" ; Paris, A+U, 1990, pp. 146–51
 F. Ghiai, " Yady az Heydar Ghiai", Rahavard, No.26, No27, No28, No29, Los Angeles, 1990-91-92-93, pp. 246–52, pp. 233–40
 M. Ghiai, Iran Senate House, Max Gerard Edt. Draeger Paris, 1976 
 Architecture d'aujourd'hui, No.78, 1958, "Exposition et Hotel à Téhéran", pp. 96–101
 F. Bemont, "Téhéran Contemporain", Art&Architecture, Teheran, No.17, 1973, pp. 85–88
 B. Oudin, Dictionnaire des Architectes, Paris, 1982, p. 187 
 H. Stierlin, Iran des Batisseurs, "2500 ans d'Architecture", Geneva, 1971, p. 102
 Michel Ragon Histoire de l'architecture et de l'urbanisme modernes, éd.Casterman, Paris, 1986 
 E. Yarshater, Encyclopædia Iranica, Volume X, New-York, 2001, p. 591-92
 M. Akri, "Iran during the Pahlavi Era, Major political players", London, 1989, p. 392
 R. Ghirshman, Persia El reino immortal, London, 1971, p. 141
 Paris Match, "La Grandeur d'un Règne; le Sénat Iranien", No.1448, Paris, 1977, p. 12
 Teheran Journal, "Downtown's Masterpiece", March 5, 1977, p. 6
 Architecture Méditerranéenne, No 55, "From father to son, a dynasty of builders", Marseille, 2001, pp. 130–60
 Jours de France, "Monde", June 21, 1965, p. 65
 Jean Royere "Decorateur a paris" page 40 p165 edition Norma

Building Consultants References

External links

 Official Parsian Esteghlal International Hotel webpage
 Official Parsian Hotels webpage

Hotel buildings completed in 1962
Hotels in Tehran
Hotels in Iran
Heydar Ghiai buildings and structures
Hotels established in 1962